In the West or non-Asian countries, an Asian supermarket largely describes a category of grocery stores that focuses and stocks items and products imported from countries located in the Far East (e.g. East, Southeast and South Asia).

These stores go further than a typical quintessential supermarket in that they sell general merchandise, goods, and services related to specific Asian countries of origin, immigrant communities or the ethnic enclave that the store may be located in. 

They would also often tend to diversify by carrying products from other fellow Asian countries; Japanese supermarkets would carry some Chinese, Indonesian, Korean and Singaporean products; Korean supermarkets carry some Chinese and Japanese products; Taiwanese supermarkets carry Chinese, Korean, Japanese, Thai, Vietnamese products, and so on.

Overview
Asian supermarkets carry items and ingredients generally well-suited for Asian cuisines and simply not found or considerably more expensive in most Western supermarkets, due to low turnover and small quantities.

While it primarily caters to a single particular Asian cultural group, many also additionally caters to other Asian immigrant groups who do not have easy access to foodstuffs from their country of origin. These are prevalent in Asian enclaves in the United States and Canada. Urban centers such as New York City, Los Angeles, Washington, D.C., San Diego, Chicago, Houston, Dallas, Atlanta, San Francisco, Philadelphia, St. Louis, and Seattle have Chinatowns, Little Indias, Little Saigons, Koreatowns, or Japantowns and other ethnic neighborhoods with specialty small business, but surrounding areas or smaller cities will have Asian supermarkets providing the same but reduced amenities for the same purposes.

Sometimes, these markets are surrounded by an Asian-themed strip mall. The markets are generally ethnocentric and may be mainly Chinese, Indonesian, Japanese or Filipino market; however, in many areas such supermarkets cater to a more diverse Asian population as a means of financial diversification and Pan-Asian cooperation. 

It is this diversity that led to the establishment of Pan-Asian goods in a one-stop shop with aisles selling foods in common and others dedicated to other groups such as Pakistani, Bangladeshi, Indian, Malaysian, Singaporean, Vietnamese, Thai, Taiwanese, Korean, and others. Some Asian supermarkets in Australia and the United States also stock Pacific food items aimed at the Pacific Islander communities in those countries. Similarly, some Asian supermarkets in the Netherlands stock items from Suriname aimed at the large Surinamese communities of Indian and Javanese origins found in the country. 

Despite sourcing from many multiple nations, items stocked are very different depending on their target ethnic market. For example, in Chinese and Vietnamese supermarkets it is common for animal meat to be hung on hooks for display; in Japanese supermarkets this is less common except for seafood. Chinese supermarkets may also carry Japanese products but the range of selection would be very limited as compared to a Japanese supermarket. For example, for green tea, in a Japanese market, an entire aisle may be dedicated to it, stocking a wide variety and grades of regional loose-leaf teas, whereas the Chinese market may simply carry a few brands of Japanese tea bags and bottled teas, while focusing on chrysanthemum tea.

Chains

Though most Asian supermarkets tend to be neighborhood oriented, small and independent and may carry similar or even identical names, many large chains of stores have floor area that is comparable to other American supermarket chain stores. Among the largest of these chains is H Mart, which has 66 locations.

Major chains include:
 Chinese and Pan-Asian: Hong Kong Supermarket (US-6 locations), Kam Man Food (East Coast US), Hoo Hing (UK), Miracle Supermarket (Australia-New South Wales), Grand Asia Market (US), Nations Fresh Foods (Canada-Ontario), Lion Supermarket (US- Silicon Valley),  zTao Marketplace (US-Texas, Georgia), G&L Supermarket (Good Luck Plaza ) (Chinese, Southeast Asian, Indian, Korean and Japanese) (Australia-New South Wales) Asian Foods  (Chinese, Japanese, Thai, Malaysian, Indonesian, Singaporean, Indian, Sri Lankan, Bangladeshi, Pakistani, Filipino and Korean) (Australia-Queensland) iFresh Supermarket
 Filipino and Pan-Asian: Seafood City (US-25 stores, Canada-5 stores), Island Pacific Supermarket (US-California), Manila Oriental Market (Filipino, Japanese, Chinese, Vietnamese, Thai, Indian and Korean) (US-California), Amazing Oriental (東方行) (Chinese, Indian, Japanese, Malaysian, Filipino, Sri Lankan, Taiwanese, Vietnamese, Indonesian, Korean, Singaporean, Surinamese and Thai) (Netherlands)
 Hawaiian and Japanese: Marukai Corporation U.S.A. (US-West Coast and Hawaii, 11 stores as of 2018)
 Indian and Pan-Asian: Patel Brothers (US-54 stores), Subzi Mandi Cash & Carry (US-10 stores, Canada-5 stores), Sabzi Mandi (Canada-7 stores), Panchvati Supermarket (Canada-5 stores), MKS Spices 'N Things (Australia-Victoria), Asian Food Centre (Canada-7 stores),  India Town Food Centre (Canada-2 stores), Indian Grocery Store (UK-London)
 Japanese: Marukai (US-14 stores), Nijiya Market (US, 12 stores), Mitsuwa Marketplace (US, 11 stores), Uwajimaya (Greater Seattle and Greater Portland, OR), Yaohan (defunct)
 Korean: H Mart (84 stores as of 2021), Zion Market & Zion Mart (US, 6 stores), Assi Market (US, 3 stores), Arirang Supermarket (US, 2 stores), Galleria Supermarket (Canada-Greater Toronto), Oseyo (UK, 6 stores), Lotte Plaza (US, 14 stores)
 Taiwanese: 99 Ranch Market (US), T & T Supermarket (Canada), 168 Market (US-California, Nevada, 6 stores)
 Vietnamese: Shun Fat Supermarket (US-14 locations)

Online
Due to concentration of immigrant communities in metropolitan areas, few Asian supermarket chain stores are located in non-metro areas. In order to better compete and serve this market, a few of these chains have begun online sales, which compete directly with the likes of general online e-commerce merchandisers such as Amazon.com, Walmart.com, Shopee and Rakuten.

In Asia
Major operators in Asia such as AEON, Don Quijote (Don Don Donki) and Jusco operate somewhat like Asian supermarkets, as they offer products not normally found in their home countries; as such they also serve as a platform for selling regional Asian cuisines and foods from their origin country. An example would be selling a Singaporean drink in Japan and vice versa, when they are both Asian countries.

Operations
Most of these supermarkets are started and operated by Asian immigrant entrepreneurs and their families. Others are started by investors of existing corporate conglomerates already headquartered in Asia, namely Mainland China, Hong Kong, Japan, the Philippines, Singapore, South Korea, and Taiwan.

Asian supermarkets can range from small mom-and-pop grocery stores to large big-box stores and may cater specifically to one ethnic Asian immigrant group or to a wide pan-Asian crowd. They serve the generally unserved or underserved immigrant and descendant population. They are usually the main attraction for food shopping within overseas Asian shopping malls and Chinatowns.  Asian supermarkets may re-occupy older buildings formerly anchored by mainstream regional or national supermarket chains.

Chinese shopping centers and supermarkets have been constructed using traditional Chinese architecture, and provide services catered toward immigrant customers. Examples include Asian restaurants, beauty salons, bakeries, foreign film rental stores, travel agencies, book stores, and other businesses.

In recent years, some mainstream markets have attempted to compete with Asian supermarkets for the minority customer base by stocking certain Asian goods as well as directing marketing towards various Asian ethnic immigrant populations. Conversely, some Asian supermarkets attempt to appeal to the general population. Asian markets are reputed to have lower prices than the mainstream chains.

Asian supermarkets represent a new trend in which Asian immigrants no longer settle in old enclaves such as Chinatown, San Francisco but in suburbs where shopping centers provide services as well as cultural amenities, such as hosting ethnic festivals, shows and dance.

One of the major redevelopments highlighted in the press has been Buford Highway in the Atlanta suburb of Doraville, Georgia, where Asian supermarkets have done brisk business in a once-blighted neighborhood. Such supermarkets have also revitalized the once-rundown sections of Bellaire Blvd in Houston, Texas, and turned it into a thriving new Asian shopping district.  There are also many competing Chinese supermarkets in the Southern California Chinatowns and Vietnamese markets anchoring communities such as Little Saigon.

Products

See also 

 Religious goods store
 Chinatown
 Koreatown
 Japantown
 Vietnamtown
 Little Manila
 Night market
 Wet market
 Toko (shop), similar type of shop in the Netherlands
 List of supermarket chains in the United States

References

External links

 "The New Chinatown? Try the Asian Mall", The New York Times—article on the growing trend of Asian supermarkets in the United States
Asian food dollars go east—article on impact of Asian supermarkets in New Zealand
 "Grass Jelly, Anyone? 99 Ranch Brings Asian Flavor to East Bay"—newspaper article from Berkeley, CA

Asian cuisine
Asian drinks
Supermarkets by culture